The Bung Tomo class is a class of three Indonesian multi role patrol corvettes or Multirole Light Frigates (MRLF) by Indonesia. They were originally built for the Royal Brunei Navy and named Nakhoda Ragam-class corvettes but were ultimately bought by Indonesia and renamed. The class is named after Bung Tomo, a noted leader of Indonesia's independence movement.

Background

The three vessels were built by BAE Systems Marine (now BAE Systems Maritime - Naval Ships).  The contract was awarded to GEC-Marconi in 1995 and the ships, a variant of the F2000 design, were launched in January 2001, June 2001 and June 2002 at the then BAE Systems Marine yard at Scotstoun, Glasgow. The customer refused to accept the vessels and the contract dispute became the subject of arbitration. When the dispute was settled in favour of BAE Systems, the vessels were handed over to Royal Brunei Technical Services in June 2007.

In 2007, Brunei contracted the German Lürssen shipyard to find a new customer for the three ships. The ships are now in service with the Indonesian Navy.

The ships were originally armed with MBDA Exocet Block II anti-ship missiles and MBDA Seawolf air defence missiles. The main gun is an Oto Melara 76 mm; the ship also carries two torpedo tubes, two 30 mm remote weapon stations and has a landing spot for a helicopter. As 2018 the MBDA Seawolf missile was out of service due to expired and there was plan to replace it with VL Mica

Operational history
In late December 2014, KRI Bung Tomo was involved in search and recovery operations of the Indonesia AirAsia Flight 8501 which crashed off the Java Sea between the islands of Belitung and Borneo. Later in early January 2015, KRI Usman Harun was deployed to search for the black boxes as the ship is equipped with the Thales Underwater Systems TMS 4130C1 hull-mounted sonar. In late April 2021, KRI Bung Tomo was involved in the search for the then missing

Ships of the class
KRI Bung Tomo is named after Sutomo, the leader of Indonesian guerrillas during the Battle of Surabaya. The naming of KRI John Lie memorializes the first Chinese Indonesian to be honored as National Hero of Indonesia, who was also one of the first high ranking navy commanders during the Indonesian National Revolution. 
The naming of KRI Usman Harun memorializes Harun Said and Osman Hj Mohd Ali, who were executed by Singapore after the MacDonald House bombing, creating a controversy between the two nations.

Modernisation
On 10 March 2020 in Jakarta, Len Industri and Thales signed a contract for the complete modernisation of the Indonesian Navy KRI Usman Harun multi-role light frigate's mission system, witnessed by King Willem-Alexander of the Netherlands and Indonesian Minister of Trade Agus Suparmanto. This upgrade for the KRI Usman Harun is expected to be completed by the end of 2023, and it will considerably extend the life of the frigate.

A final specification was drawn up, including Thales's TACTICOS Combat Management System,  SMART-S Mk2 3D and STIR 1.2 EO Mk2 radars, a Vigile Mk2 ESM, and two new tactical data links – Link Y Mk2 and a tactical data link that will be delivered by PT Len Industri, providing connectivity to Indonesia's military communications network and enabling the corvette to play its full part in wider naval task forces. The systems' commonality with those on other Indonesian ships would reduce training time and facilitate management and maintenance. Existing weaponry will also be fully integrated, and a new VL MICA surface-to-air missile system added – a significant boost for the vessel's air defense capability.

See also
  - Four ships later commissioned by the Royal Brunei Navy.
  - Two other F2000 derived ships built for the Royal Malaysian Navy.

References

External links

Nakhoda Ragam Class Corvette (Naval Technology)
Clydebuilt ships Picture
Story by ocnus.net

Corvette classes
Corvettes of the Indonesian Navy